Advisory Council elections were held in Northern Rhodesia in April 1920.

Electoral system
Northern Rhodesia was split into two constituencies, North-Western Rhodesia (four seats) and North-Eastern Rhodesia (one seat). Voting was restricted to British subjects over the age of 21 who had lived in the territory for at least six months and owned at least £150 of property.

Results

References

1920 in Northern Rhodesia
1920
1920 elections in Africa
1920